A desert planet, also known as a dry planet, an arid planet, or a dune planet, is a theoretical type of terrestrial planet with a surface consistency similar to Earth's hot deserts.

History 
A 2011 study suggested that not only are life-sustaining desert planets possible, but that they might be more common than Earth-like planets.  The study found that, when modeled, desert planets had a much larger habitable zone than ocean planets.  The same study also speculated that Venus may have once been a habitable desert planet as recently as 1 billion years ago.  It is also predicted that Earth will become a desert planet within a billion years due to the Sun's increasing luminosity.

A study conducted in 2013 concluded that hot desert planets without runaway greenhouse effect can exist in 0.5 AU around Sun-like stars. In that study, it was concluded that a minimum humidity of 1% is needed to wash off carbon dioxide from the atmosphere, but too much water can act as a greenhouse gas itself. Higher atmospheric pressures increase the range in which the water can remain liquid.

Science fiction  

The concept has become a common setting in science fiction, appearing as early as the 1956 film Forbidden Planet and Frank Herbert's 1965 novel Dune. The environment of the desert planet Arrakis (also known as Dune) in the Dune franchise drew inspiration from the Middle East, particularly the Arabian Peninsula and Persian Gulf, as well as Mexico. Dune in turn inspired the desert planets which prominently appear in the Star Wars franchise, including the planets Tatooine, Geonosis, and Jakku.

See also 
 Exoplanet
 Ocean planet

References 

Science fiction themes
Fictional terrestrial planets
Hypothetical planet types

Planet